HMS Cavalier is a retired  destroyer of the Royal Navy. She was laid down by J. Samuel White and Company at East Cowes on 28 March 1943, launched on 7 April 1944, and commissioned on 22 November 1944. She served in World War II and in various commissions in the Far East until she was decommissioned in 1972. After decommissioning she was preserved as a museum ship and currently resides at Chatham Historic Dockyard.

Construction
Cavalier was one of 96 War Emergency Programme destroyers ordered between 1940 and 1942. She was one of the first ships to be built with the forward and aft portions of her hull welded, with the midsection riveted to ensure strength. The new process gave the ship additional speed. In 1970 a 64-mile race was arranged between Cavalier and the frigate , which had the same hull form and machinery.

Service history
After commissioning she joined the 6th Destroyer Flotilla, part of the Home Fleet, and took part in a number of operations off Norway. She and the other escorts reformed the convoy, and returned to Britain with the loss of only three of the thirty-four ships. This action earned Cavalier a battle honour.

Later in 1945 Cavalier was despatched to the Far East, where she provided naval gunfire support during the Battle of Surabaya. In February 1946 she went to Bombay to help quell the Royal Indian Navy Mutiny. After some time in the British Pacific Fleet she was paid off in May 1946 and was placed in reserve at Portsmouth.

From 1955 to 1957, Cavalier was modernised at Thornycroft's Woolston, Southampton shipyard, with the modernisation including removing some of her torpedo tubes and a 4.5-inch gun in favour of two Squid anti-submarine mortars. She recommissioned on 16 June 1957, replacing  in the 8th Destroyer Squadron in Singapore. From March to April 1958, Cavalier took part in the Operation Grapple, the British nuclear weapon tests at Malden Island and Kiritimati. In August 1959, Cavalier was ordered to the important RAF base at Gan Island in the Maldives in response to civil unrest, remaining there until relieved by sister ship  on 29 August. In December 1962 she transported 180 troops from Singapore to Brunei to help suppress a rebellion that became part of the Indonesia-Malaysia Confrontation. After disembarking the troops she remained in Brunei as a communications centre for several days until other Royal Navy ships arrived to relieve her. Cavaliers bows were badly damaged, while one of Burgans crew suffered head injuries and had to be airlifted to hospital. Cavalier underwent temporary repairs at Portsmouth before being fitted with a new bow at Devonport. She finally underwent the planned refit at Gibraltar from August 1964 to April 1966.

On 6 July 1971 Cavalier would participate in a race against a similar ship, . Cavalier narrowly won the race after a safety valve blew on Rapid. Cavalier was presented with the 'Cock o' the Fleet' award. The award can be seen on the ship's bridge to this day.

Cavalier was decommissioned in 1972 and is the last surviving British destroyer of World War 2 still in the UK.

Fate
After decommissioning at Chatham Dockyard, she was laid up in Portsmouth. As a unique survivor, after a five-year campaign led by Lord Louis Mountbatten, the ship was purchased by the Cavalier Trust for £65,000 and handed over on Trafalgar Day 1977 in Portsmouth. By selling the ship to the Trust, the UK Government and the Royal Navy severed all formal connection and responsibility for the ship. A special warrant was issued that allows her to retain the prefix "HMS" (His Majesty's Ship) and fly the White Ensign, a privilege normally only enjoyed by commissioned ships of the Royal Navy. A similar privilege is enjoyed by another museum ship, the cruiser .

Moved to Southampton, Cavalier opened as a museum and memorial ship in August 1982.  This was not commercially successful, and in October 1983 the ship was moved to Brighton, where she formed the centrepiece of a newly built yacht marina.

In 1987, the ship was brought to the River Tyne to form the centrepiece of a national shipbuilding exhibition centre planned by South Tyneside Metropolitan Borough Council in the former shipyard of Hawthorn Leslie and Company, builders of many similar destroyers. The plans for the museum came to nothing, and the borough council, faced with annual maintenance costs of £30,000 and a hardening of public opinion against unnecessary expenditure, resolved to sell the ship and wind up the venture in 1996. The ship sat in a dry dock (owing to a previous list) in a rusting condition, awaiting a buyer or scrapping in situ.

After the reforming of the Cavalier Trust, and a debate in Parliament, in 1998 Cavalier was bought by Chatham Historic Dockyard for display as a museum ship. Arriving on 23 May 1998, Cavalier now resides in No. 2 dry-dock.

On 14 November 2007, Cavalier was officially designated as a war memorial to the 142 Royal Navy destroyers sunk during World War II and the 11,000 men killed on those ships. The unveiling of a bronze monument created by the artist Kenneth Potts was conducted by Prince Philip, Duke of Edinburgh. The monument is adjacent to the ship at the Historic Dockyard in Chatham, Kent.

In the summer of 2009 the Chatham Historic Dockyard Trust made available accommodation on board the ship for youth groups who wish to stay on board and experience life on board a Royal Naval destroyer.

In September 2010, Cavalier fired the first full broadside from a ship flying the White Ensign since a firing by the destroyer  in December 1981. This was due to the work of the heritage naval gun crew who restored all three 4.5-in guns back to working condition in conjunction with the Chatham Historic Dockyard Trust.

In April 2014 Cavalier was added to Google Maps Business View (formerly Google Business Photos) in celebration of the 70th anniversary of her launch. The tour, which includes  Cavaliers engine and gear room, was enhanced with interactive audio hotspots to enable visitors with accessibility issues to explore the ship.

Gallery

References

Publications

External links

 
 Chatham Historic Dockyard
 HMS Cavalier Association

 

World War II destroyers of the United Kingdom
Cold War destroyers of the United Kingdom
Museum ships in the United Kingdom
1944 ships
C-class destroyers (1943) of the Royal Navy
Ships and vessels of the National Historic Fleet